This List of German abbreviations includes abbreviations, acronyms and initialisms found in the German language. Because German words can be famously long, use of abbreviation is particularly common. Even the language's shortest words are often abbreviated, such as the conjunction und (and) written just as "u." This article covers standard abbreviations in colloquial and official use. It does not include abbreviations that are important historically but no longer in common usage, such as k. u. k. for Imperial and Royal and OKW for Oberkommando der Wehrmacht.

Types
As in English or Latin, German written abbreviations consist of a letter, letters or partial words shortened from a longer word or phrase, such as etc. for et cetera. Acronyms are a type of abbreviation pronounced as a single word, such as Laser. Initialisms are abbreviations in which each initial in the abbreviation is pronounced separately, such as FBI. It is unsettled question in English style guides whether the word acronym can be used to also describe initialisms. This list makes a distinction between the types because of the way German-speakers create, use and pronounce them.

 Abbreviations: German written abbreviations are often punctuated and are pronounced as the full word when read aloud, such as beispielsweise for bspw. ("for example"). Unlike English, which is moving away from periods in abbreviations in some style guides, the placement of capital letters and periods is important in German.
 Acronyms are abbreviations consisting of initials of words in the original phrase, written without periods, and pronounced as if they were a single word. Examples that have made their way into German from English include Laser or NATO. In German, acronyms retain the grammatical gender of their primary noun.
 Syllable words, or syllabic abbreviation or clipping, is a particularly German method of creating an acronym by combining the first two or more letters of each word to form a single word. An example is the gummy bear brand Haribo, which is derived from the name of its creator Hans Riegel and the city where it was created, Bonn. A number of German syllable words have made it into English usage, such as Adidas, from company founder Adi Dassler, and Gestapo for Geheime StaatsPolizei (Secret State Police). Although used and pronounced as words in their own right, according to Helmut Glück they are classified as acronyms.
 Initialism is a type of abbreviation consisting of the initials of each word in a phrase, almost always capitalized, and pronounced separately. In German they are never punctuated. Examples include EU for European Union and DDR for German Democratic Republic. Initialisms are typically found in commercial, government, legal, medical, scientific and technical uses. In German, initialisms retain the grammatical gender of their primary noun.

Key to Sources in Tables 
These sources apply to all three tables. In special cases an entry will be additionally referenced.

List of German abbreviations
This is a selection of standard written abbreviations and symbols in German. The primary reference is Langenscheidt with additional sources providing more current uses and an indication of their popularity. German abbreviations are pronounced just like the full word or phrase when read aloud. Measurements are normally reduced to initials, written in lowercase, and without punctuation. Measurements of capacity in cooking can be uppercase.

List of German acronyms 
An acronym is a general type of abbreviation formed from the initial components of words in a longer name or phrase and pronounced as words. Included in this table are syllable words, with the fragments used to create the clipping displayed in bold.

List of German initialisms 
Acronyms pronounced as individual letters are rather than words are more specifically called initialisms. They are written without periods and retain the grammatical gender of their primary noun.

References

German
Abbreviations
Abbreviations